Nikolai Petrovich Batalov (6 December 1899 in Moscow – 10 November 1937 in Moscow) was a Soviet and Russian stage and film actor. He performed in a number of notable films between 1924 and 1931.

He was awarded the title Merited Artist of the Russian Federation in 1933.

He married People's Artist of the USSR Olga Androvskaya in 1921. He was actor Aleksei Batalov's uncle.

Life and career
Batalov joined the Second Studio of the Moscow Art Theater in 1916 and became a member of the theater’s main troupe in 1924.
Batalov’s film debut was the supporting role of Red Army private Gusev in Yakov Protazanov’s science fiction film Aelita (1924). 
Batalov gained international recognition as the heroic worker Pavel Vlasov in Vsevolod Pudovkin’s Mother (1926).  In Abram Room’s controversial social drama Bed and Sofa (1927) played a more humorous character. The film was a fictionalized account of the relationship of the Russian poet Vladimir Mayakovsky who lived with Lilya Brik and her husband Osip Brik for some years. Batalov became one of the most in demand Soviet silent film actors. He transitioned to sound film successfully with the first Soviet sound feature, Nikolai Ekk’s Road to Life (1931), in which he portrayed Communist educator Nikolai Sergeev who wins the trust of homeless juvenile delinquents and converts them to Soviet ideals. Lev Kuleshov cast Batalov in the title role of Jewish watchmaker Leo Horizon in Horizon (1932), the second Soviet sound film, released in early 1933. Batalov also starred in a number of historical and adventure films such as The Shepherd and the Tsar (1935). Semen Timoshenko’s comedy Three Comrades (1935), in which Batalov played efficient manager Latsis, was also a success.
He died in 1937 after a lengthy illness of severe tuberculosis.

Selected filmography

References

External links

1899 births
1937 deaths
20th-century Russian male actors
Male actors from Moscow
Honored Artists of the RSFSR
Recipients of the Order of the Red Banner of Labour
Russian male film actors
Russian male silent film actors

Russian male stage actors
Soviet male film actors
Soviet male silent film actors
Soviet male stage actors
Tuberculosis deaths in Russia
Burials at Novodevichy Cemetery
20th-century deaths from tuberculosis